Giulianova is a coastal town and comune in the province of Teramo, Abruzzo region, Italy. The comune also has city status, thus also known as Città di Giulianova.

Geography
The town lies in the north of the Abruzzo region, between the Salinello and the Tordino rivers. Giulianova is split between the Paese, the historic town up in the hills, and the lido, the more recent development down by the beach.

Tourism plays a big part in the town's economy. The town, characterized by several beaches, is a summer retreat for people from large cities like Rome and Milan, as well as German and French tourists.

History
In pre-Roman times, the Praetutii tribe had a settlement there. In 3rd century BCE Romans established a colony called Castrum Novum in the vicinity of Giulianova. In the Middle Ages, the old Castrum Novum was called Castrum divi Flaviani, and remained an important trade and travel hub, until it was destroyed in 1460, during the Tordino Battle. The local baron Giulio Antonio Acquaviva, founded, in 1471, a new city up on the hill, not far from the older one, calling its Giulia. It was an interesting example of renaissance ideal city, applying the theory of the most important architects of the time, as Leon Battista Alberti and Francesco Di Giorgio Martini, with the cultural environment of whom, he was in contact.

Main sights

 Church of Santa Maria a Mare, belonging to the former city of San Flaviano. Founded before the 11th century, it is a brickwork building with a sail-like bell tower. The portal is from the late 13th century, and has a relief with "Madonna with Child and Animals", while two lions guard the sides, one holding a book and the other fighting with a snake. Under the arch are 18 stone tiles depicting enigmatic figures, described by some a representation of the Zodiac and the seasons
 The octagonal Cathedral of San Flaviano, built from 1472. The dome was originally covered by blue majolica. It houses a marble sculpture of "Madonna with Child" by Venanzo Crocetti
 Sanctuary Madonna of the Splendor. In the sacristy is the 16th century Pala dello Splendore, an altarpiece by Paolo Veronese
 Ducal Palace
Torre del Salinello, a watch tower built in the 16th century to guard from Turk pirates.

People 
 Gabriele Tarquini (born 1962), racing driver
 Gaetano Braga (1829–1907), cellist and composer
 Domenico "Dom" Serafini (born 1949), journalist
 Venanzo Crocetti (1913–2003), sculptor
 Egidio De Maulo Born in Giulianova, November 4, 1840 – Rome 1922 ( Painter )
 Lorenzo Piani (1955-2016), singer and songwriter

Sports
The main football team of the town was Giulianova Calcio which participated in professional leagues, namely Serie C (and its divisions). It was replaced by A.S.D. Città di Giulianova 1924 in 2012 and then Real Giulianova in 2016.

References

External links 

 
Official tourist website
Photoblog about life in the harbour of Giulianova

 
Cities and towns in Abruzzo
Populated places established in the 1470s